Francisco Collantes (1599–1656) was a Spanish Baroque era painter.

Collantes was born in Madrid but sought influence from Jusepe de Ribera and the Neapolitan School.  He was also influenced by 16th century Venetian painters and was renowned for his landscapes and biblical scenes.

His works included The Burning Bush (c. 1634) which is now at the Louvre, Agar and Ishmael which is now at the Museum of Art, Rhode Island School of Design, in Providence, and The Vision of Ezekiel, Saint Arnulph and The Fall of Troy (about 1634), all three now at the Museo del Prado in Madrid.

References

Bibliography
Angulo Íñiguez, Diego, y Pérez Sánchez, Alfonso E. Pintura madrileña del segundo tercio del siglo XVII, 1983, Madrid: Instituto Diego Velázquez, CSIC,

External links

Francisco Collantes on Artcyclopedia

1599 births
1656 deaths
Artists from Madrid
Spanish Baroque painters